Cringer was an American punk rock band originally from Manoa, Hawaii, active from 1985 to 1991.  The band was formed by Lance Hahn and Gardner Maxam, who remained the band's two consistent members and later formed J Church.  They released a series of vinyl records and were formative in the Hawaiian punk rock community before relocating to Los Angeles and later San Francisco.  At the time of his death in 2007, songwriter Hahn was remembered for his prolific output, dedication to art and activism, and representation of Asian Americans in punk rock, all of which began with his time in Cringer.

History
Cringer took its name from the talking cat in the animated series He-Man and the Masters of the Universe.  With Hahn playing guitar and Maxam singing, the group's first lineup included bassist Ed Tarantino and drummer David Carr.  This lineup released several demo cassettes and the 7" Perversion Is Their Destiny.

Tarantino and Carr left the band shortly thereafter, and the new lineup included Maxam on bass guitar, Hahn playing drums, guitarist Simon Barry, and vocalist Francis Sippin. Sippin's tenure was brief, however, and Hahn and Maxam became lead vocalists.  This lineup recorded the Zen Flesh, Zen Bones 7".  Drummer Derek Imose joined thereafter and Simon departed, with Hahn returning to guitar.

The group had relocated to Los Angeles, where Maxam was attending college.  They played with a lineup including guitarist Nigel Wong and recorded the Tikki Tikki Tembo No Sa Rembo Chari Bari Ruchi Pip Peri Pembo album, taking its name from a 1968 picture book set in ancient China.  Wong departed and was replaced briefly by Dave Gomez.

In 1989, Hahn, Maxam, and Imose moved to San Francisco and were joined by second guitarist Harry Sherrill.  This lineup released the Karin 7" on Lookout! Records.  Imose was later replaced by drummer Kamala Parks, co-founder of 924 Gilman Street and later of the bands Naked Aggression, Hers Never Existed, and The Gr'ups.  This lineup released several 7" singles and toured extensively, including stints with Green Day, Neurosis, and Thatcher on Acid.

Cringer disbanded in 1991.  Several posthumous releases followed, including the final Rain 7" and the Greatest Hits Vol. 1 compilation.  After the breakup, Hahn and Maxam formed J Church. Maxam remained with them until 1998, and Hahn kept the band active until his death in October 2007.  In 2018, Parks and three musicians formed Cringeworthy, a tribute band playing the songs of Cringer and J Church.

Members

Lance Hahn – guitar (1985–1986, 1988–1991), lead vocals (1986–1991), drums (1986–1988)
Gardner Maxam – lead vocals (1985–1986), bass guitar and vocals (1986–1991)
Ed Tarantino – bass guitar (1985–1986)
David Carr – drums (1985–1986)
Francis Sippin – lead vocals (1986)
Simon Barry – guitar and vocals (1986–1988)

Derek Imose – drums (1988–1990)
Nigel Wong – guitar (1988–1989)
Dave Gomez – guitar (1989)
Harry Sherrill – guitar (1989–1991)
Kamala Parks – drums (1990–1991)

Timeline

Discography

Albums
Tikki Tikki Tembo, No Sa Rembo, Chari Bari Ruchi, Pip Peri Pembo (Vinyl Communications, 1990)

Live albums
23 Minutes For Fans (Hawaiian Express Records, 2001)

Compilations
Greatest Hits, Vol. 1 (Vinyl Communications, 1993)
We're All AOK (Hawaiian Express Records, 2012)

Singles
Perversion Is Their Destiny 7" (Honey Bear Records, 1987)
Zen Flesh, Zen Bones 7" (Vinyl Communications, 1988)
Karin 7" (Lookout! Records, 1990)
Time for a Little Something... 7" (Vinyl Communications, 1991)
Live in Europe 7" (Vinyl Communications, 1991)
Rain 7" (Vinyl Communications, 1992)

References

External links
Cringer The Vinegar Tasters at the Hawaii Punk Museum
Cringer's first demo at the Hawaii Punk Museum
Cringer at Myspace.com

American punk rock groups
Musical groups from Hawaii